Most regions of Japan, such as Honshu, Shikoku, and Kyushu, belong to the temperate zone with humid subtropical climate (Köppen climate classification Cfa) characterized by four distinct seasons. However, its climate varies from cool humid continental climate (Köppen climate classification Dfb) in the north such as northern Hokkaido, to warm tropical rainforest climate (Köppen climate classification Af) in the south such as the Yaeyama Islands and Minami-Tori-shima.

Climate zones

Japan's varied geographical features divide it into six principal climatic zones.
 Hokkaido belongs to the humid continental climate, with long, cold winters and cool summers. Precipitation is sparse; however, winter brings large snowfalls of hundreds of inches in areas such as Sapporo and Asahikawa.
 In the Sea of Japan, the northwest seasonal wind in winter gives heavy snowfall, which south of Tōhoku mostly melts before the beginning of spring. In summer, it is a little less rainy than the Pacific area but sometimes experiences extreme high temperatures because of the foehn wind phenomenon.
 Central Highland: a typical inland climate gives large temperature variations between summers and winters and between days and nights. Precipitation is lower than on the coast because of rain shadow effects.
 Seto Inland Sea: the mountains in the Chūgoku and Shikoku regions block the seasonal winds and bring mild climate and many fine days throughout the year.
 Pacific Ocean: the climate varies greatly between the north and the south, but generally winters are significantly milder and sunnier than those of the side that faces the Sea of Japan. Summers are hot because of the southeast seasonal wind. Precipitation is very heavy in the south and heavy in the summer in the north. The climate of the Ogasawara Islands ranges from a humid subtropical climate (Köppen climate classification Cfa) to tropical savanna climate (Köppen climate classification Aw) with temperatures being warm to hot all year round.
 The climate of the Ryukyu Islands ranges from a humid subtropical climate (Köppen climate classification Cfa) in the north to a tropical rainforest climate (Köppen climate classification Af) in the south with warm winters and hot summers. Precipitation is very high and is especially affected by the rainy season and typhoons.

Precipitation

Japan is generally a rainy country with high humidity. Because of its wide range of latitude, seasonal winds and different types of ocean currents, Japan has a variety of climates, with a latitude range of the inhabited islands from 24°N – 46°N, which is comparable to the range between Nova Scotia and The Bahamas in the east coast of North America. Tokyo is between 35°N – 36°N, which is comparable to that of Tehran, Athens, or Las Vegas.

As Mount Fuji and the Japanese coastal Alps provide a rain shadow, Nagano and Yamanashi Prefectures receive the least precipitation in Honshu, though it still exceeds  annually. All other prefectures have coasts on the Pacific Ocean, Sea of Japan, and Seto Inland Sea, or have a body of salt water connected to them. Two prefectures—Hokkaido and Okinawa—are composed entirely of islands.

Seasons

Summer
The climate from June to September is marked by hot, wet weather brought by tropical airflows from the Pacific Ocean and Southeast Asia. These air flows are full of moisture and deposit substantial amounts of rain when they reach land. There is a marked rainy season, beginning in early June and continuing for about a month. It is followed by hot, sticky weather. Five or six typhoons pass over or near Japan every year from early August to early October, sometimes resulting in significant damage. Annual precipitation averages between  except for the areas such as Kii Peninsula and Yakushima Island which is Japan's wettest place with the annual precipitation is one of the world's highest at 4,000 to 10,000 mm.

Maximum precipitation, like the rest of East Asia, occurs in the summer months except on the Sea of Japan coast where strong northerly winds produce a maximum in late autumn and early winter.

Mid-June to mid-July is generally the rainy season in Honshu, Shikoku, and Kyushu, excluding Hokkaidō since the seasonal rain front or  dissipates in northern Honshu before reaching Hokkaido. In Okinawa, the rainy season starts early in May and continues until mid-June. Unlike the rainy season in mainland Japan, it rains neither every day nor all day long during the rainy season in Okinawa. Between July and October, typhoons, grown from tropical depressions generated near the equator, can attack Japan with furious rainstorms.

Winter

In winter, the [[Siberian Highting on the Pacific.

The warmest winter temperatures are found in the Nanpō and Bonin Islands, which enjoy a tropical climate due to the combination of latitude, distance from the Asian continent, and warming effect of winds from the Kuroshio, as well as the Volcano Islands (at the latitude of the southernmost of the Ryukyu Islands, 24° N). The coolest summer temperatures are found on the northeastern coast of Hokkaidō in Kushiro and Nemuro Subprefectures.

Sunshine
Sunshine, in accordance with Japan's uniformly heavy rainfall, is generally modest in quantity, though no part of Japan receives the consistently gloomy fogs that envelope the Sichuan Basin or Taipei. Amounts range from about six hours per day on the Inland Sea coast and sheltered parts of the Pacific Coast and Kantō Plain to four hours per day on the Sea of Japan coast of Hokkaidō. In December there is a very pronounced sunshine gradient between the Sea of Japan and the Pacific coasts, as the former side can receive less than 30 hours and the Pacific side as much as 180 hours. In summer, however, sunshine hours are lowest on exposed parts of the Pacific coast where fogs from the Oyashio current create persistent cloud cover similar to that found on the Kuril Islands and Sakhalin.

Extreme temperature records
The highest recorded temperature in Japan was 41.1 °C (106.0 °F) on 23 July 2018, an unverified record of 42.7 °C was taken in Adachi, Tokyo on 20 July 2004. The high humidity and the maritime influence make temperatures in the 40s rare, with summers dominated by a more stable subtropical monsoon pattern through most of Japan. The lowest was −41.0 °C (−41.8 °F) in Asahikawa on 25 January 1902. However an unofficial −41.5 °C was taken in Bifuka on 27 January 1931. Mount Fuji broke the Japanese record lows for each month except January, February, March, and December. Record lows for any month were taken as recently as 1984.

Minami-Tori-shima has a tropical savanna climate (Köppen climate classification Aw) and the highest average temperature in Japan of 25 degrees Celsius.

Climate data

See also
 Climate of China
 East Asian Monsoon

References

Geography of Japan
Climate